is the fourth sequel of the original Captain Tsubasa videogame series by Tecmo. It's a direct sequel of Captain Tsubasa 3: Koutei no Chousen and released exclusively in Japan for Nintendo's Super Famicom on April 3, 1993. However it graphics are subdued compared to its predecessor.

Reception
In Japan, the game topped the Famitsu sales chart in April 1993.

References

External links
 Characters featured in the instruction manual at Giant Bomb
 Game reviews at GameFAQs
 Soundtrack information at SNESmusic
 Captain Tsubasa IV at superfamicom.org

1993 video games
Pro no Rival Tachi
Japan-exclusive video games
Super Nintendo Entertainment System games
Super Nintendo Entertainment System-only games
Tecmo games
Video game sequels
Multiplayer and single-player video games
Video games developed in Japan
Video games scored by Hiroshi Miyazaki